Perosa Argentina (French: Pérouse) is a comune (municipality) in the Metropolitan City of Turin in the Italian region Piedmont, located about  northwest of Turin, in the val Chisone.

Perosa Argentina borders the following municipalities: Coazze, Giaveno, Roure, Pinasca, Perrero, Pomaretto, and Inverso Pinasca.

References

External links
 Official website

Cities and towns in Piedmont